The Ministry of Interior and Municipalities in Lebanon is responsible for governorate, caza, municipalities, federation of municipalities and village matters, in addition to political parties and organizations.

The ministry was created in the first post-independence government in 1943. In 2000, it was named the Ministry of Interior and Municipalities. As of September 2021 the current minister is Bassam Mawlawi.

See also
List of town without municipalities in Lebanon

References

External links
 Ministry of Interior and Municipalities

1943 establishments in Lebanon
Lebanon, Interior and Municipalities
Interior and Municipalities
Lebanon